An offprint is a separate printing of a work that originally appeared as part of a larger publication, usually one of composite authorship such as an academic journal, magazine, or edited book. 

The Encyclopedia of Library and Information Science states that, according to James Murray's New English Dictionary on Historical Principles, the word was derived from the German separatabdruck or the Dutch afdruk.

Offprints are used by authors to promote their work and ensure a wider dissemination and longer life than might have been achieved through the original publication alone. They may be valued by collectors as akin to the first separate edition of a work and, as they are often given away, may bear an inscription from the author. Historically, the exchange of offprints has been a method of correspondence between scholars.

See also
 Preprint
 Reprint

References

External links 
 
 
 

Printing terminology
Academic publishing
Magazine publishing